The fifth season of Without a Trace premiered September 24, 2006 on CBS and ended on May 10, 2007. There are 24 episodes in this season. This season includes the 100th episode. For the U.S. 2006–07 television season the fifth season of Without a Trace ranked 16th with an average of 14.7 million viewers and in the 18–49 demographic ranked 28th with a 4.1/11 Rating/Share.

The fifth season of Without a Trace has not been released on DVD in region 1 but was released in region 2 in Germany on July 17, 2009 and in the UK on February 22, 2010. In region 4 the fifth season was released on July 1, 2009 However it was released on Amazon Video in early 2012.

Cast
 Anthony LaPaglia as FBI Missing Persons Unit Special Agent John Michael "Jack" Malone
 Poppy Montgomery as FBI Missing Persons Unit Special Agent Samantha "Sam" Spade
 Marianne Jean-Baptiste as FBI Missing Persons Unit Special Agent Vivian "Viv" Johnson
 Enrique Murciano as FBI Missing Persons Unit Special Agent Danny Taylor
 Roselyn Sánchez as FBI Missing Persons Unit Special Agent Elena Delgado
 Eric Close as FBI Missing Persons Unit Special Agent Martin Fitzgerald

Episodes

References

Without a Trace seasons
2006 American television seasons
2007 American television seasons